Sorin Mircea Oprescu (born 7 November 1951) is a Romanian independent politician and medical doctor who previously served as Mayor of Bucharest between 2008 and 2015.

Political activity

Oprescu first ran for Mayor of Bucharest in 1998 backed by the Party of Social Democracy in Romania (PDSR), the precursor to the modern-day Social Democratic Party (PSD). He was eliminated in the first round with 19.3% of the vote, losing to incumbent Viorel Lis who was supported by the Christian Democratic National Peasants' Party (PNȚ-CD). He ran again in 2000, achieving the highest first-round total (40.12%) but losing in the second round with 49.31% to winner Traian Băsescu's 50.69%.

He was one of the independent candidates running for President of Romania in the presidential election which took place on 22 November 2009. He was eliminated in the first round, gaining only 3.18% of the total cast votes and thereby placing on the 5th position, and was involved in a notable Condorcet cycle with Mircea Geoană and eventual winner Traian Băsescu.

He was also a senator representing the Social Democratic Party (PSD) between 2000 and April 2008, serving as the vice-president of the Senate Committee for Public Health. Oprescu resigned from the Senate on 24 June 2008.

In February 2006, Oprescu also became the president of the Social Democratic Party's Bucharest branch, a position from which he stepped down upon quitting the party in April 2008.

In 2008, after the Social Democratic Party (PSD) refused to nominate him to the mayoral elections, he ran as an independent candidate. He earned the most votes in the first round of the elections. In the second round against the Democratic Liberal Party (PDL) candidate Vasile Blaga, with the support of the National Liberals and Social Democrats (who announced they would support anyone who ran against the Democratic Liberals), he won with 56.55% of the vote. Nevertheless, the Social-Democrat mayor of Bucharest's Sector 2, Neculai Onţanu, announced he supported Blaga, while the Social Democratic mayor of Sector 5, Marian Vanghelie, announced he would not support Oprescu and even accused him of being a "cheap demagogue".

Conviction

In September 2015, he was arrested on charges of corruption. On 15 September 2015, being deposed by Bucharest's Prefect upon a courts' decision to maintain Oprescu's arrest, an interim successor was elected from one of the city's deputy-mayors.

Electoral history

Mayor of Bucharest

Presidential elections

References

External links
Sorin Oprescu - official site

1951 births
Living people
Mayors of Bucharest
Social Democratic Party (Romania) politicians
Candidates for President of Romania
20th-century Romanian physicians
21st-century Romanian physicians
Physicians from Bucharest
Chevaliers of the Légion d'honneur